Sergio Hernández (born 30 January 1971) is a Venezuelan footballer. He played in 30 matches for the Venezuela national football team from 1993 to 1996. He was also part of Venezuela's squad for the 1993 Copa América tournament.

References

External links
 

1971 births
Living people
Venezuelan footballers
Venezuela international footballers
Place of birth missing (living people)
Association football midfielders
Deportivo Táchira F.C. players